The William H. Nichols Medal is awarded annually for original research in chemistry. Nominees must have made a "significant and original contribution in any field of chemistry" during the five years preceding the presentation date. The  medallist receives a gold medal, a bronze replica and a cash award. The award was established in 1902 by the New York Section of the American Chemical Society (ACS) through a gift from chemist and businessman William H. Nichols. It was the first award to be approved by the ACS. The medal was first awarded in 1903.

Recipients 
The award is given yearly and was first presented in 1903.

 1903 Edward B. Voorhees
 1904 (no award given)
 1905 Charles L. Parsons
 1906 Marston T. Bogert
 1907 Howard B. Bishop
 1908 William Hultz Walker
 1909 H. H. C. P. Weber
 1909 William A. Noyes
 1910 L. H. Baekeland
 1911 C. W. Easley
 1911 M. A. Rosanof
 1912 Charles James
 1913 (no award given)
 1914 Moses Gomberg
 1915 Irving Langmuir
 1916 Claude S. Hudson
 1917 (no award given)
 1918 Treat Baldwin Johnson
 1919 (no award given)
 1920 Irving Langmuir
 1921 Gilbert N. Lewis
 1922 (no award given)
 1923 Thomas Midgely, Jr.
 1924 Charles A. Kraus
 1925 Edward Curtis Franklin
 1926 S. C. Lind
 1927 Roger Adams
 1928 Hugh S. Taylor
 1929 William L. Evans
 1930 
 1931 John A. Wilson
 1932 James B. Conant
 1933 (no award given)
 1934 Henry C. Sherman
 1935 Julius A. Nieuwland
 1936 William M. Clark
 1937 Frank C. Whitmore
 1938 P. A. Levene
 1939 Joel H. Hildebrand
 1940 John M. Nelson
 1941 Linus Pauling
 1942 Duncan A. MacInnes
 1943 
 1944 Carl S. Marvel
 1945 Vincent du Vigneaud
 1946 Wendell M. Stanley
 1947 George B. Kistiakowski
 1948 Glenn T. Seaborg
 1949 I. M. Kolthoff
 1950 
 1951 Henry Eyring
 1952 Frank H. Spedding
 1953 Reynold C. Fuson
 1954 Charles P. Smyth
 1955 Wendell M. Latimer
 1956 Robert Burns Woodward
 1957 Louis P. Hammett
 1958 Melvin Calvin
 1959 Herbert C. Brown
 1960 Herman F. Mark
 1961 Peter J. W. Debye
 1962 Paul J. Flory
 1963 Louis F. Fieser
 1964 Arthur C. Cope
 1965 Herbert E. Carter
 1966 Frederick D. Rossini
 1967 Karl Folkers
 1968 William S. Johnson
 1969 Marshall Nirenberg
 1970 Britton Chance
 1971 Henry Taube
 1972 John D. Roberts
 1973 R. Bruce Merrifield
 1974 Harold A. Scheraga
 1975 F. Albert Cotton
 1976 Paul D. Bartlett
 1977 Elias J. Corey
 1978 
 1979 Choh Hao Li
 1980 Gilbert Stork
 1981 Roald Hoffmann
 1982 Frank H. Westheimer
 1983 Neil Bartlett
 1984 Fred W. McLafferty
 1985 Jerome A. Berson
 1986 Michael J. S. Dewar
 1987 Kurt Mislow
 1988 Ralph F. Hirschmann
 1989 Ronald Breslow
 1990 John D. Baldeschwieler
 1991 J. Calvin Giddings
 1992 Koji Nakanishi
 1993 Richard E. Smalley
 1994 Peter B. Dervan
 1995 Stephen J. Lippard
 1996 K. C. Nicolaou
 1997 Jacqueline K. Barton
 1998 Ahmed H. Zewail
 1999 Samuel J. Danishefsky
 2000 Barry M. Trost
 2001 Stuart L. Schreiber
 2002 Alan G. MacDiarmid
 2003 Harry Gray
 2004 Allen J. Bard
 2005 Richard N. Zare
 2006 K. Barry Sharpless
 2007 Nicholas J. Turro
 2008 Nadrian C. Seeman
 2009 Carolyn R. Bertozzi
 2010 Tobin J. Marks
 2011 Julius Rebek, Jr.
 2012 Alan G. Marshall
 2013 Richard Eisenberg
 2014 Amos B. Smith, III
 2015 Gabor A. Somorjai
 2016 Stephen L. Buchwald
 2017 Chad Mirkin
 2018 Debra R. Rolison
 2019 Vicki Grassian
 2020 Krzysztof Matyjaszewski
 2021 (No award given)

See also

 List of chemistry awards

References 

Awards of the American Chemical Society